{{DISPLAYTITLE:Tau1 Arietis}}

Tau1 Arietis, Latinized from τ1 Arietis, is the Bayer designation for a triple star system in the northern constellation of Aries. The combined apparent visual magnitude is 5.27, making it faintly visible to the naked eye.

The Tau1 Arietis system contains three stars.  The inner pair form an eclipsing binary system, with the brightness of the pair decreasing by 0.06 in magnitude during an eclipse of the primary. Its period is 2.20356 days. The third component is located at an angular separation of 0.810 arcseconds and has a magnitude of 8.17. The primary component is a subgiant star with a stellar classification of B5 IV. It has five times the mass of the Sun with about four times the Sun's radius.

This system is a member of the Cas-Tau OB association of stars that share a common motion through space.

References

External links
Aladin previewer
Aladin sky atlas
 HR 1005
 CCDM J03212+2109

Arietis, 61
020756
015627
Arietis, Tau1
Aries (constellation)
B-type subgiants
Eclipsing binaries
Triple star systems
1005
Durchmusterung objects